Ducati: 90th Anniversary is a motorcycle racing video game developed and published by Italian developer Milestone. It was released digitally for Microsoft Windows, PlayStation 4, and Xbox One on 9 June 2016. The game also had a retail release in Italy, exclusive to GameStop shops.

Features
Ducati – 90th Anniversary is a standalone spin-off title of Milestone's 2015 motorcycle game Ride. The game is dedicated entirely to the history of the Italian Ducati motorcycle company which had been founded in 1926 and which rose to prominence with their racing bikes in the 1950s.

The game includes 39 motorcycles produced by Ducati from their beginnings to the present day, as well as several well known models used by Ducati's professional riders throughout the decades. The following models are featured in the game:

The game also includes eight licensed circuits from around the world:
 Imola
 Potrero de los Funes
 Alméria
 Road America
 Magny-Cours
 Donington Park
 Sugo
 Misano

References

External links 

2016 video games
Ducati (company)
Milestone srl games
Multiplayer and single-player video games
Multiplayer online games
Motorcycle video games
PlayStation 4 games
Racing video games
Video games developed in Italy
Video games set in Italy
Windows games
Xbox One games